The 2014 Hampton Pirates football team represented Hampton University in the 2014 NCAA Division I FCS football season. They were led by first year head coach Connell Maynor and played their home games at Armstrong Stadium. They were a member of the Mid-Eastern Athletic Conference. They finished the season 3–9, 2–6 in MEAC play to finish in a tie for ninth place.

Schedule

Source: schedule

References

Hampton
Hampton Pirates football seasons
Hampton Pirates football